Stublla e Epërme is a village in Viti municipality, Kosovo. It is located in the Karadak mountains.

History 
Stublla e Epërme has been home to Catholics for centuries. In 1584 there was an Albanian school functioning in the village.

Demographics 
As of 2011 there are 1,128 inhabitants living in the village, all of whom are Albanian.

References 

Populated places in Kosovo
Gjilan